Viger was a provincial electoral district in Quebec, Canada.

It consisted of part of the Saint-Léonard,  Rosemont and  Mercier-Est neighbourhoods in Montreal.

It was created for the 1981 election.  Its final general election was in 1998; there was also a by-election in 2002.  It disappeared in the 2003 election as its territory was carved up and distributed among the new electoral district of Jeanne-Mance–Viger and the existing electoral districts of Anjou and Rosemont.

It was named jointly for Denis-Benjamin Viger and Jacques Viger, who were prominent politicians in the 1830s and 1840s.

Members of the National Assembly

References

External links
Election results
 Election results (National Assembly)
 Election results (QuebecPolitique.com)
Maps
 1992–2001 changes (Flash)

Former provincial electoral districts of Quebec